Camp Columbia  from an old poetic name for the United States  may refer to the following U.S. Army bases:

 Camp Columbia (Havana), during the First Occupation of Cuba
 Camp Columbia (Wacol), during World War II
 Camp Columbia (Hanford), a prison camp during and after World War II

Also:  Camp Columbia State Park/State Forest